The Yeso River is a river in Chile that runs 4 miles (~6km) and is one of the main tributaries of the Maipo River. Rapids for the Yeso River vary between Class IV and V and the river has many steep drops and narrow chutes. It serves as a source of water for Metropolitan Santiago.

See also
List of rivers of Chile

References

 EVALUACION DE LOS RECURSOS HIDRICOS SUPERFICIALES EN LA CUENCA DEL RIO BIO BIO

Rivers of Chile
Rivers of Santiago Metropolitan Region